Czech Sovereignty, formerly Free Bloc and Sovereignty – Jana Bobošíková Bloc, is a small Czech political party.

Origins
It was formed after the break-up of the electoral alliance Suverenita – blok Jany Bobošíkové, Strana zdravého rozumu between the Party of Common Sense (Strana zdravého rozumu) and Politika 21 (led by Jana Bobošíková,  the conservative and Eurosceptic former MEP).

It was formed in 2011 in Prague. Since January 2014 its leader is the former social democratic MP Jana Volfová.

History of the electoral alliance Suverenita – blok Jany Bobošíkové, strana zdravého rozumu
The Party of Common Sense took part in the 2002 election to the Chamber of Deputies three months after its foundation, but won only 0.2% of the vote.  This increased to 0.5% of the vote in 2006 election.

The alliance ran in the 2009 European election under the name 'Sovereignty' and led by Bobošíková, an MEP elected in 2004 for the Independent Democrats.  The list came fifth, winning 4.3% of the vote: just short of the 5% threshold for representation. Sovereignty took part in the 2010 election, and won 3.7% of the vote, falling short of parliamentary representation once again.

History of the Free Bloc
Free Bloc took part in the 2021 election, and won 1.33% of the vote, falling short of parliamentary representation. In January 2022 the party changed its name back to Czech Sovereignty.

Election results

Chamber of Deputies

References

External links
 Official website

2011 establishments in the Czech Republic
Eurosceptic parties in the Czech Republic
Nationalist parties in the Czech Republic
Political parties established in 2011